The River Niger Bridge in Onitsha (also known as the Onitsha Bridge), Anambra State, Nigeria connects southeastern Nigeria with western Nigeria over the Niger River. It is linked to Asaba in Delta State, Nigeria.

History
Feasibility studies and design considerations on the possibility of constructing a bridge across River Niger from Asaba to Onitsha was carried out by the Netherlands Engineering Consultants of The Hague, Holland (NEDECO) in the 1950s, Between 1964 and 1965, French construction giant, Dumez, constructed the Niger Bridge, to link Onitsha and Asaba in present-day Anambra and Delta States respectively at an estimated cost of £6.75 million. Construction of the bridge was completed in December 1965.

After its completion, the bridge was eight by four hundred and twenty feet (8×420 ft.) with a carriageway of 36 feet centre-truss and a pedestrian walkway on both sides of the carriageway.  It was commissioned by the then Prime Minister the late Alhaji Tafawa Balewa and opened for traffic in December 1965. The commissioning of the bridge was the last public function of the Prime Minister before his assassination on January 15, 1966.

During the Nigerian Civil War of 1967 - 1970, in an attempt to halt the Nigerian military advance, retreating Biafran soldiers destroyed the River Niger Bridge at Onitsha, trapping the Nigerians on the other side of the river. During  President Goodluck Ebele Jonathan administration, the bridge was rehabilitated by replacing two spans on the Onitsha end of the bridge that was damaged during the civil war with a fourteen-foot wide bailey, at an estimated cost of 1.5 million pounds.

External links
 Video of the Niger Bridge (Youtube.com)

References

 
 

Bridges in Nigeria
Onitsha
Crossings of the Niger River